The National Renaissance Party may refer to:
 National Renaissance Party (United States)
 National Renaissance Party (Dominican Republic)
  National Renaissance Party (Russia), constitutional monarchist party
 National Renaissance Front, former Romanian para-fascist party